Mary Lattimore (born 1980) is an American classically trained harpist based in Los Angeles, California. In addition to her solo work and collaborations with fellow Philadelphia musician Jeff Zeigler, she has performed with prominent indie musicians including Thurston Moore, Kurt Vile, and Steve Gunn.

Biography
Originally from Asheville, North Carolina, Lattimore was raised in western North Carolina. Her mother was also a harpist, and so Mary learned to play the harp when she was 11 years old. She was not very interested in it at first, but this began to change as she got better at it. She studied at the Eastman School of Music where she worked on the college radio.

Musical career
One of Lattimore's first musical activities was her contribution to the Valerie Project, which released its self-titled debut album in 2007. This album was intended to be an alternative soundtrack to the film Valerie and Her Week of Wonders.

Lattimore released her first solo effort in 2012, a self-titled cassette, on Fred Thomas' Life Like imprint. The following year, this album was re-released by Desire Path Recordings as The Withdrawing Room.

In 2014, Lattimore and Zeigler released Slant of Light on Thrill Jockey.

Also that year, Lattimore received a Pew Fellowship grant, which she used to travel around California and Texas; while doing so, she recorded the album At the Dam, which was released on Ghostly International in 2016. The album's title was taken from an essay about the Hoover Dam in Joan Didion's 1979 book The White Album.

On 18 May 2018, Lattimore released the album Hundreds of Days, which received critical acclaim.

Lattimore's harp work is featured in an episode of Atlas Obscura released in 2021. On Steve Gunn's album Other You (Matador, August 30, 2021) she contributed to “Sugar Kiss,” an instrumental duet.

Discography
Studio albums
 The Withdrawing Room (Desire Path, 2013)
 At the Dam (Ghostly International, 2016)
 Hundreds of Days (Ghostly International, 2018)
 Silver Ladders (Ghostly International, 2020)

Collaborative albums
 Slant of Light (with Jeff Zeigler) (Thrill Jockey, 2014)
 Ghost Forests (with Meg Baird) (Three Lobed Recordings, 2018)
 New Rain Duets (with Mac McCaughan) (Three Lobed Recordings, 2019)

Compilation albums
 Luciferin Light (Kit, 2015)
 Collected Pieces (Ghostly International, 2017)
Collected Pieces II (Ghostly International, 2021)

References

External links
 
 Lattimore on Bandcamp
 Lattimore discography at Discogs

American harpists
21st-century American composers
21st-century women musicians
21st-century women composers
Musicians from Asheville, North Carolina
Thrill Jockey artists
Ghostly International artists
The Valerie Project members
1980 births
Living people